The politics of Shanghai is structured in a dual party-government system like all other governing institutions in the mainland of the People's Republic of China (PRC). In the last few decades the city has produced many of the country's eventual senior leaders, including Jiang Zemin, Zhu Rongji, Wu Bangguo, Huang Ju, Xi Jinping, Yu Zhengsheng, Han Zheng, and Li Qiang.

Overview 
The Mayor of the Shanghai Municipal People's Government (上海市人民政府市长, shorten as 上海市市长 ie Mayor of Shanghai Municipality) is the highest ranking executive official in Shanghai. Since Shanghai is a direct-controlled municipality of China, the Mayor occupies the same level in the order of precedence as provincial governors. However, in the city's dual party-government governing system, the mayor has less power than the Communist Party of China Shanghai Municipal Committee Secretary (中国共产党上海市委员会书记, shorten as 中共上海市委书记), colloquially termed the "Shanghai CCP Party Chief" in English.

Before 1941, Shanghai had a split administration: the International Settlement (governed under the Shanghai Municipal Council), the French Concession, and the Chinese City. The Chinese city was invaded by the Japanese in 1937 and the foreign concessions were occupied by the Japanese in 1941. After the occupation, the foreign powers formally ceded the territory to the Nationalist Government in Chongqing (a move largely symbolic until the Japanese surrender since the Nationalists no longer controlled Shanghai).

List of provincial-level leaders

Secretaries of the Communist Party Shanghai Committee

Chairpersons of Shanghai People's Congress 

 Yan Youmin (严佑民): 1979－1981
 Hu Lijiao (胡立教): 1981－1988
 Ye Gongqi (叶公琦): 1988－1998
 Chen Tiedi (陈铁迪) (female): 1998－2003
 Gong Xueping (龚学平): 2003－2008
 Liu Yungeng (刘云耕): 2008－2013
 Yin Yicui (殷一璀) (female): 2013－2020
 Jiang Zhuoqing (蒋卓庆): 2020－2023
 Dong Yunhu (董云虎): 2023－incumbent

Mayors of Shanghai 

Prior to the establishment of the office of Mayor of Shanghai, the city's administration was overseen by the circuit intendant ("taotai" / "daotai", 道臺). The office was abolished at the fall of the Qing.

Chairpersons of the Political Conference Shanghai Committee 

 Ke Qingshi (柯庆施): 1955－1958
 Chen Pixian (陈丕显): 1958－1967
 Peng Chong (彭冲): 1977－1979
 Wang Yiping (王一平): 1979－1983
 Prof. Li Guohao (李国豪): 1983－1988
 Prof. Xie Xide (谢希德) (female): 1988－1993
 Chen Tiedi (陈铁迪) (female): 1993－1998
 Wang Liping (王力平): 1998－2003
 Jiang Yiren (蒋以任): 2003－2008
 Feng Guoqin (冯国勤): 2008－2013
 Wu Zhiming (吴志明): 2013－2018
 Dong Yunhu (董云虎): 2018－2023
 Hu Wenrong (胡文容): 2023－incumbent

Chairpersons of the Shanghai Supervisory Committee 

 Liao Guoxun (廖国勋): January 2018－March 2020
 Liu Xuexin (刘学新): July 2020－October 2022
 Li Yangzhe (李仰哲): October 2022－incumbent

See also 

Circuit intendant of Shanghai
Old City of Shanghai
Politics of Beijing
Politics of Chongqing
Politics of Tianjin
Zhuang Xiaotian

References 

 
Shanghai
Shanghai
Shanghai